Garaga is a genus of planthoppers belonging to the family Delphacidae.

Species:
 Garaga flagelliformis Ding, 2006 
 Garaga hailongensis Ding & Zhang, 1990

References

Delphacidae